Kocahamzalı is a small village in Yenişehir district, which is an intracity district within Greater Mersin, Turkey. It overlooks Mersin and local TV and radio stations have installed transmitter stations in the village. The population of the village was 142 
as of 2012.

References